Farallon (Farallón meaning cliff in the Spanish Language) may refer to:

Farallon Capital, American capital management firm
Farallon Computing, later known as Netopia, known for PhoneNet networking and Timbuktu remote control software
Farallon de Medinilla, small island in the Northern Mariana Islands chain
Farallon de Pajaros (Birds Rock), the northernmost island in the Northern Mariana Islands chain
Farallon de Torres, a former name of Zealandia Bank in the Northern Mariana Islands chain
Farallon Island Light, lighthouse on Southeast Farallon Island, California
Farallon Islands, group of islands and rocks in the Gulf of the Farallones, off the coast of San Francisco, California, USA
Farallon Plate, ancient oceanic plate
Farallon Steamship Disaster, wooden steamship hit Black Reef in the Farallon Islands in 1910 and sank in Alaska
Farallon Trench, ancient oceanic trench on the west coast of North America during the Late Cretaceous period
Kula-Farallon Ridge, ancient mid-ocean ridge between the Kula and Farallon plates in the Pacific Ocean during the Jurassic period
Pacific-Farallon Ridge, former mid-ocean ridge between the Pacific and Farallon plates in the Pacific Ocean during the Tertiary period
Farallon (island), Panama